This is a list of schools in Taguig, Metro Manila, Philippines.

Public Tertiary
Philippine Public Safety College
Polytechnic University of the Philippines, Taguig campus
Technological University of the Philippines-Taguig Campus
Taguig City University
TESDA
University of the Philippines BGC

Private Tertiary
De La Salle University Rufino (BGC) Campus
STI College
Lyceum International College
St. Chamuel College & Institute of Technology
AMA Computer Learning Center
Enderun Colleges
MINT College
Open Source College
Philippine School of Interior Design
St. Therese School of Technology of Taguig, Inc.

International schools
The Beacon School
British School Manila
Everest Academy Manila
Global Leaders International School
International School Manila
Leaders International Christian School of Manila
Lyceum International College
Treston International School
Korean International School Philippines
Manila Japanese School

Private Elementary/High School
AA Total Achievers Academy, Inc.
MERE ACADEMY INC.
Moreh Academy
Our Lady of Snow Excel School, Inc.
Living Miracle Foundation Inc. (LMFI)
Holy Spirit Christian Learning Centre, Inc.
Learn and Explore Montessori School, Inc.
Angels of the Lord School of Taguig, Inc.
Athens Academy
Grace Christian College Foundation, Inc.
Anne-Claire Montessori (Maria Jasee Montessori)
TMB Madrasah-Montessori Learning Center
Armys Angels Integrated School (Main Campus)
Armys Angel Integrated School (Annex)
Sto. Nino Catholic School
 Mary Lourdes Academy, Inc.
MCA Montessori School (Main Campus)
MCA Montessori School (Annex)
Integrated Montessori Center (Main/Diego Branch)
Integrated Montessori Center (Bayani Branch)
Spring of Kerith Montessori School, Inc.
God's Grace Christian Academy, Inc.
Battlefield Baptist Academy, Inc. 
Gentle Lamb Academy
SDLJ Montessori School
JF Holy One School
Zinah Academy
PHR-G-Gar Kinderland
Hansarang Christian Academy
Lakeview Montessori Learning Center
Noah's Academy
The Abba's Orchad School, Inc.
Balmor Christian School
Merry Knowledge Academe, Inc.
FTJCA Christian Academy
Athens Academy, Inc.
G4 Learning Journey School, Inc.
Little Friends of St. Mary Learning Center, Inc.
Mt. Moriah Christian Academy
Monlimar Development Academy
Huckleberry Montessori School, Inc. (Pateros)
St. Theodore School
St. Ives School
St. Ignatius
Academia de San Bartolome de Taguig
Colegio de Sta. Ana
Tipas Catholic School
Central Village Thinkers Academy
Centerville Academy, Inc.
Heaven's Door Christian Academy
Children's Integrated Learning School
Thy Covenant Montessori School
Saint Francis of Assisi College of Taguig, Inc.
Saint Helena School
Bicutan Parochial School
Huckleberry Montessori School, Inc.
Green Homes Integrated School, Inc.
SBP Child Learning Advancement School
Tridium Academy
Taguig National Highschool

Former Schools
Christian Harvest Academy (Original from Parañaque then moved to ARCA South, now closed in 2022)

Science High School
Taguig Science High School
Senator Rene Cayetano Science and Technology High School

See also
List of schools in Metro Manila (primary and secondary)
List of international schools in Metro Manila
List of universities and colleges in Metro Manila

References

Taguig